The PFL 8 mixed martial arts event for the 2018 season of the Professional Fighters League was held on October 5, 2018, at the Ernest N. Morial Convention Center in New Orleans, Louisiana.

Background
The event was the eighth of the 2018 season and marked the start of the playoffs.

Philipe Lins was expected to face Valdrin Istrefi in a playoff bout at this event, however, Istrefi was removed due to injury and replaced by the highest ranked alternate on the undercard, Caio Alencar. As a result, Alencar's original opponent of Mike Kyle was paired with Mo De'Reese in a bout to determine a new alternate.

Timur Valiev was expected to face Alexandre de Almeida in a playoff bout at this event, however, Valiev was removed due to injury and replaced by the highest ranked alternate on the undercard, Jumabieke Tuerxun. As a result, Tuerxun's original opponent of Marcos Galvão was set to face Jeremy Kennedy in a bout to determine a new alternate. However, on the day of the event Kennedy dropped out due to undisclosed reasons, and so Galvao was automatically pushed forward as the new alternate instead.

Fight card

2018 PFL Heavyweight playoffs

2018 PFL Featherweight playoffs

See also
List of PFL events
List of current PFL fighters

References

Professional Fighters League
2018 in mixed martial arts
Mixed martial arts in New Orleans
Sports competitions in New Orleans
October 2018 sports events in the United States
Events in New Orleans